The Roman Catholic Diocese of Saint-Jean–Longueuil is a suffragan of the Metropolitan Archdiocese of Montréal in (mostly francophone) Québec, southeastern Canada.

Its cathedral episcopal see is the Cathédrale Saint-Jean-l’Évangéliste dedicated to John the Evangelist, in Saint-Jean-sur-Richelieu.

It has a Co-Cathedral: Cocathédrale Saint-Antoine-de-Padoue, dedicated to Saint Anthony of Padua, in Longueuil, Québec, and a Minor basilica: Basilique Sainte-Anne-de-Varennes, in Varennes, Québec.

History 
Erected on 9 June 1933, as the Diocese of Saint-Jean-de-Québec, on territory split off from the Archdiocese of Montréal, its Metropolitan.
It was renamed on 27 February 1982 as Diocese of Saint-Jean–Longueuil / SanctiIoannis–Longolien(sis) (Latin).

Statistics 

Bishops

Episcopal Ordinaries 
(all Roman Rite native Canadians)

 Suffragan Bishops of Saint-Jean-de-Québec 
Paul-Ernest-Anastase Forget (1934.05.12 – death 1955.02.03)
Gérard-Marie Coderre (1955.02.03 – retired 1978.05.03), died 1993; succeeded as former Titular Bishop of Ægæ (1951.07.05 – 1955.02.03) and Coadjutor Bishop of Saint-Jean-de-Québec (1951.07.05 – 1955.02.03)
Bernard Hubert (1978.05.03 – 1982.02.27 see below), previously Bishop of Saint-Jérôme (Canada) (1971.06.25 – 1977.01.27), Coadjutor Bishop of Saint-Jean-de-Québec (1977.01.27 – 1978.05.03)

 Suffragan Bishops of Saint-Jean-de-Longueuil 
Bernard Hubert (see above 1982.02.27 – death 1996.02.02), also President of Canadian Conference of Catholic Bishops (1985 – 1987)
Jacques Berthelet, Viatorians (C.S.V.) (1996.12.27 – retired 2010.10.28), also President of Canadian Conference of Catholic Bishops (2001 – 2003); previously Superior General of Clerics of Saint Viator (Viatorians) (1984 – 1986.12.19), Titular Bishop of Lamsorti (1986.12.19 – 1996.12.27) as Auxiliary Bishop of Saint-Jean–Longueuil (1986.12.19 – succession 1996.12.27)
Lionel Gendron, P.S.S. (28 October 2010 - retired 5 November 2019), also vice-president of Canadian Conference of Catholic Bishops (2015.09.15 – 2017.09.27); previously Titular Bishop of  Tagase (2006.02.11 – 2010.10.28) as Auxiliary Bishop of Archdiocese of Montréal (Canada) (2006.02.11 – 2010.10.28)
Auxiliary Bishop (2004.06.19 – 2020.07.19): Louis Dicaire, Titular Bishop of Thizica (1999.02.18 – 2020.07.19), previously Auxiliary Bishop of Archdiocese of Montréal (Canada) (1999.02.18 – 2004.06.19)
Auxiliary Bishop (2015.12.22 – 2019.11.05): Claude Hamelin, Titular Bishop of Apollonia (2015.12.22 – 2019.11.05); next Bishop here
Claude Hamelin (5 November 2019 – present)

Coadjutor bishops
Gérard-Marie Coderre (1951–1955)
Bernard Hubert (1977–1978)

Auxiliary bishops
Robert Lebel (1974–1976), appointed Bishop of Valleyfield, Québec
Jacques Berthelet, C.S.V. (1986–1996), appointed Bishop here
Louis Dicaire (2004–2020)
Claude Hamelin (2015–2019), appointed Bishop here

Other priest of this diocese who became bishop
Raymond Poisson, appointed Auxiliary Bishop of Saint-Jérôme, Québec in 2012

See also 
List of Catholic dioceses in Canada

Sources and external links
GCatholic, with Google map - data for all sections
Diocese of Saint-Jean-Longueuil site (in French)

References

Roman Catholic Ecclesiastical Province of Montreal
Religious organizations established in 1933
Roman Catholic dioceses and prelatures established in the 20th century
Organizations based in Longueuil
1933 establishments in Quebec